Moorends is a village in the north-east of the Metropolitan Borough of Doncaster, South Yorkshire, England, situated on the border with East Yorkshire and Lincolnshire.  It was historically part of the West Riding of Yorkshire until 1974. It is part of the civil parish of Thorne, which lies to the south.

The moors can be accessed via Grange Road.

The legendary goalkeeper Ted Sagar was born in Moorends in 1910. It is also home to one public house.

External links

Thorne-Moorends Town Council

Villages in South Yorkshire
Thorne, South Yorkshire